The Women's 50 metre rifle three positions competition at the 2015 European Games in Baku, Azerbaijan was held on 19 June at the Baku Shooting Centre.

Schedule
All times are local (UTC+5).

Records

Results

Qualification

Final

References

External links

Women's 50 metre rifle three positions
Euro